Doria's tree-kangaroo (Dendrolagus dorianus) is a long-tailed, furry, bear-like mammal found only in tropical mountain forests on the island of New Guinea (in Papua New Guinea). It is one of the largest tree-kangaroos (genus Dendrolagus), living alone in trees and active at night to feed on leaves or fruit. It belongs to the macropod family (Macropodidae) with kangaroos, and carries its young in a pouch like other marsupials. Threats include hunting and habitat loss.

Distribution
The species was named in 1883 by Edward Pierson Ramsay in honour of Italian zoologist Giacomo Doria.

Description
It has long dense brown fur with black ears and a pale brown or cream nonprehensile tail. It has large and powerful claws and a stocky build that gives it a bear-like appearance.

It is mostly solitary and nocturnal.

Its diet consists of various leaves, buds, flowers and fruits. The gestation period is about 30 days, after which, the single young remains in the mother's pouch for up to 10 months.

Conservation
Doria's tree-kangaroo is an IUCN Red List Vulnerable species. Its forest habitat is threatened by logging and forest clearance. Being large sized, it's also hunted for its meat.

References

Macropods
Marsupials of New Guinea
Endemic fauna of Papua New Guinea
Mammals of Papua New Guinea
Vulnerable fauna of Oceania
Mammals described in 1883